Visakha Museum (Full name: Visakhapatnam Municipal Corporation Museum) is a museum located in the port city of Visakhapatnam in Andhra Pradesh, India, which houses the historical treasures and artifacts of the Kalingandhra region. It was inaugurated by the then Chief Minister of Andhra Pradesh N. Janardhana Reddy on October 8, 1991, owned by Government of India.

Collections available for viewing in the museum include ancient armory, crockery, coins, silk costumes, jewelry, stuffed animals, portraits, manuscripts, letters, diaries, scrapbooks, periodicals, and maps. All of these were used by the early settlers in the region. Many models of warships, planes, and submarines can be found here. There are many historical items from different countries, too. The museum also showcases a searchlight reflector 30", the route of Vasco-da-Gama's maiden voyage to India and also the words of Nehru, "To be secure on land, we must be supreme at sea."

See also
 Coastal Andhra
 Visakhapatnam

References

Museums in Visakhapatnam
Local museums in India
1991 establishments in Andhra Pradesh

te:కోస్తా